Substrata is the third studio album by Norwegian electronic musician Geir Jenssen under the stage name Biosphere, released in 1997 by All Saints Records.

It is Biosphere's first truly ambient album, and has a theme of cold, of mountains and glaciers, and of running water. Sounds of howling wind and creaking wood, although infrequently employed, create a chilling soundscape interrupted by sonorous but quietly suspenseful music.

In 2001, the album was re-released in a digitally remastered format with a second disc featuring a soundtrack for Dziga Vertov's 1929 film Man with a Movie Camera, as Substrata 2.

Reception

Substrata is considered to be a classic ambient music album, consistently ranking in the top 5 in surveys on the Hyperreal ambient mailing list.

In 2016, Pitchfork ranked it at number 38 on its list of the 50 Best Ambient Albums of All Time.

Track listing

Samples
Track 4: "The Things I Tell You" – speech from Twin Peaks (Season 2, Episode 1) spoken by The Giant on his second visitation to Agent Cooper:
Sorry to wake you. [...] I forgot to tell you something. [...] The things I tell you will not be wrong.

Track 5: "Times When I Know You'll Be Sad" - interpolates a line from the popular song We'll Be Together Again.
 Track 6: "Hyperborea" – speech from Twin Peaks (same episode) from the scene where Major Briggs explains his vision to his son, Bobby:
This was a vision, fresh and clear as a mountain stream, the mind revealing itself to itself. In my vision, I was on the veranda of a vast estate, a palazzo of some fantastic proportion. There seemed to emanate from it a light from within, this gleaming, radiant marble. I'd known this place. I had in fact been born and raised there. This was my first return. A reunion with the deepest well-springs of my being. Wandering about, I noticed happily that the house had been immaculately maintained. There'd been added a number of additional rooms, but in a way that blended so seamlessly with the original construction, one would never detect any difference. Returning to the house's grand foyer, there came a knock at the door. My son was standing there. He was happy and carefree, clearly living a life of deep harmony and joy. We embraced, a warm and loving embrace, nothing withheld.  We were, in this moment, one. My vision ended, and I awoke with a tremendous feeling of optimism and confidence in you and your future. That was my vision of you. I'm so glad to have had this opportunity to share it with you. I wish you nothing but the very best in all things.
 Track 7: "Kobresia" – "Это либо металл, либо... Если металл, то крашенный... холодная поверхность..." Speech in Russian sampled from a documentary recording about Russian telepath Karl Nikolaev, who is sitting in a room trying to guess which item is lying on a table situated in a room two floors above him. This sample is taken from a Moscow radio broadcast translation. A near translation into English is:
This is either a metal or... If it is a metal, then it's painted... Cold surface... This is either a metal, painted, or could be a plastic... Colorful, there are... Bright... Seems like... Is this a toy? Probably. The surface is smooth, but... There are some bumps on it... Even the finger sticks in it... Probably it is... Some marks, or are these letters?... Or just bumps... Looks like a toy... Colorful metal, or a plastic... Painted metal... That's all... Stop.

In popular culture
The track "Antennaria" was used in the 2009 video game Osmos.

See also
Man with a Movie Camera (The Cinematic Orchestra album)

References

External links
 

1997 albums
Biosphere (musician) albums
All Saints Records albums